Akki is a surname, a given name and a nickname that may refer to the following people:

Surname
Gaurish Akki, Indian entertainment personality
Muhammad ibn Muqatil al-'Akki, Abbasid governor

Given name
Akki Chennabasappa, Indian actor
Akki Sharma (born 1991) Nepalese visual effects artist and film editor

Nickname
Akshay Kumar nicknamed Akki (born 1967) Canadian actor

Historical character
 Akki, a royal gardener in the Sumerian town of Kish, foster-father of Sargon of Akkad

Fictional characters
 Akki, a character in The Pit Dragon Trilogy series of novels by Jane Yolen
 Akki, a character in the novel The Kaiser's Last Kiss by Alan Judd

See also

Aki (name)